Acleris gobica is a species of moth of the family Tortricidae. It is found in Mongolia.

References

Moths described in 1975
gobica
Moths of Asia